The Messier Objects is the eighth studio album by German electronic band The Notwist. It was released in February 2015 under Alien Transistor Records.

Track list

References

2015 albums
The Notwist albums